Henry Hebbe (9 August 1915 – 27 May 1985) was a Norwegian speed skater. He was born in Tønsberg and represented the club Oslo SK. He competed at the 1948 Winter Olympics in St. Moritz.

References

External links

1915 births
1985 deaths
Sportspeople from Tønsberg
Norwegian male speed skaters
Olympic speed skaters of Norway
Speed skaters at the 1948 Winter Olympics
20th-century Norwegian people